The 2011 King's Cup, was the eighth edition of the King Abdullah II International Cup basketball tournament which was held in Jordan from 21–27 July 2011.

Preliminary round

Group A

Group B

Final round

Quarterfinals

Semifinals

3rd Place

Final

Awards

References 
Results

International basketball competitions hosted by Jordan
2011–12 in Asian basketball
2011–12 in Jordanian basketball
2011–12 in Belarusian basketball
2011–12 in Lebanese basketball
2011 in African basketball